{{Automatic taxobox
| taxon = Pseudexomilus
| image = Pseudexomilus fenestratus 001.jpg
| image_caption = Pseudexomilus fenestratus
| authority =  A.W.B. Powell, 1944
| synonyms_ref = 
| synonyms= 
| type_species= † Pseudexomilus caelatus Powell, 1944
| subdivision_ranks = Species
| subdivision = See text
| display_parents = 3
}}Pseudexomilus is a genus of sea snails, marine gastropod mollusks in the family Horaiclavidae.

Species
Species within the genus Pseudexomilus include:
 Pseudexomilus bicarinatus Shuto, 1983
 † Pseudexomilus caelatus Powell, 1944
 Pseudexomilus costicapitata (Verco, 1909)
 Pseudexomilus fenestratus Kilburn, 1988
 Pseudexomilus fuscoapicatus Morassi, 1997

References

 Powell, A.W.B. 1944. The Australian Tertiary mollusca of the family Turridae. Records of the Auckland Institute and Museum 3(1): 1-68
 Shuto, T. 1983. New turrid taxa from the Australian waters. Memoirs of the Faculty of Sciences of Kyushu University, Series D, Geology 25: 1-26
 Taylor, J.D., Kantor, Y.I. & Sysoev, A.V. 1993. Foregut anatomy, feeding mechanisms, relationships and classification of the Conoidea (=Toxoglossa) (Gastropoda)''. Bulletin of the British Museum (Natural History) Zoology 59: 125-170

External links
  Tucker, J.K. 2004 Catalog of recent and fossil turrids (Mollusca: Gastropoda). Zootaxa 682:1-1295.

 
Horaiclavidae